Anne Karin Dehle (born 30 July 1942) is a Norwegian former figure skater who competed in the 1950s and 1960s. She became a five-time Nordic champion and a nine-time Norwegian national champion (1958, 1960–1963, 1965–1967, 1969). She competed at the 1964 Winter Olympics, two World Championships, and seven European Championships.

Results

References

External links

1942 births
Living people
Sportspeople from Oslo
Norwegian female single skaters
Olympic figure skaters of Norway
Figure skaters at the 1964 Winter Olympics
20th-century Norwegian women